Erbium compounds are compounds containing the element erbium (Er). These compounds are usually dominated by erbium in the +3 oxidation state, although the +2, +1 and 0 oxidation states have also been reported.

Oxides 

Erbium(III) oxide (also known as erbia) is the only known oxide of erbium, first isolated by Carl Gustaf Mosander in 1843, and first obtained in pure form in 1905 by Georges Urbain and Charles James. It has a cubic structure resembling the bixbyite motif. The Er3+ centers are octahedral. The formation of erbium oxide is accomplished by burning erbium metal. Erbium oxide is insoluble in water and soluble in mineral acids.

Halides 

Erbium(III) fluoride is a pinkish powder that can be produced by reacting erbium(III) nitrate and ammonium fluoride. It can be used to make infrared light-transmitting materials and up-converting luminescent materials. Erbium(III) chloride is a violet compounds that can be formed by first heating erbium(III) oxide and ammonium chloride to prouce the ammonium salt of the pentachloride ([NH4]2ErCl5) then heating it in a vacuum at 350-400 ºC. It forms crystals of the  type, with monoclinic crystals and the point group C2/m. Erbium(III) chloride hexahydrate also forms monoclinic crystals with the point group of P2/n (P2/c) - C42h. In this compound, erbium is octa-coordinated to form  ions with the isolated  completing the structure.

Erbium(III) bromide is a violet solid. It is used, like other metal bromide compounds, in water treatment, chemical analysis and for certain crystal growth applications. Erbium(III) iodide is a slightly pink compound that is insoluble in water. It can be prepared by directly reacting erbium with iodine.

Borides 

Erbium tetraboride is a boride of erbium. It is hard and has a high melting point. It can be used in semiconductors, the blades of gas turbines, and the nozzles of rocket engines. Erbium hexaboride is another boride of erbium, with a calcium hexaboride structure. It is isostructural with all other rare-earth hexaboride compounds including lanthanum hexaboride, samarium hexaboride, and cerium hexaboride.

Other compounds 

Erbium(III) hydroxide is a pink solid that decomposes to ErO(OH) at an elevated temperature, then further heating will produce erbium(III) oxide. Erbium(III) phosphide (ErP) is also a pink solid that can be formed by the direct reaction of its constituent elements. It forms crystals of a cubic system, space group Fm3m. Erbium(III) nitrate (Er(NO3)3) forms pink crystals. It is readily soluble in water and forms crystalline hydrates. Erbium(III) acetate is a light pink solid that is used to synthesize some optical materials. The tetrahydrate of erbium(III) acetate is thermally decomposed at 90 °C, giving a proposed anhydride:
 Er(CH3COO)3·4H2O → Er(CH3COO)3 + 4 H2O
Continuing heating to 310 °C will form ketene:
 Er(CH3COO)3 → Er(OH)(CH3COO)2 + CH2=C=O
At 350 °C, the proposed Er(OH)(CH3COO)2 loses acetic acid to yield a material of the formula ErOCH3COO, forming Er2O2CO3 at 390 °C, finally obtaining Er2O3 at 590 °C.

Organoerbium compounds 

Organoerbium compounds are very similar to those of the other lanthanides, as they all share an inability to undergo π backbonding. They are thus mostly restricted to the mostly ionic cyclopentadienides (isostructural with those of lanthanum) and the σ-bonded simple alkyls and aryls, some of which may be polymeric.

See also 

 Holmium compounds
 Thulium compounds
 Ytterbium compounds

References 

Erbium
Erbium compounds
Chemical compounds by element